Beans Mill is an unincorporated community in Upshur County, West Virginia, United States.

References 

Unincorporated communities in West Virginia
Unincorporated communities in Upshur County, West Virginia